Gundagai was an electoral district of the Legislative Assembly in the Australian state of New South Wales from 1880 to 1904 in the Gundagai area. It was replaced by Wynyard.

Members for Gundagai

Election results

References

Former electoral districts of New South Wales
1880 establishments in Australia
Constituencies established in 1880
1904 disestablishments in Australia
Constituencies disestablished in 1904